The Bundarra-Barraba Important Bird Area lies in the Northern Tablelands of north-eastern New South Wales, Australia.  It is important for the conservation of the endangered regent honeyeater and is classified as an Important Bird Area (IBA) by BirdLife International.

Description
The 3500 km2 IBA is roughly bounded by the towns of Bundarra, Barraba, Kingstown and Manilla, and their connecting roads.  It is characterised by a mix of eucalypt woodlands and farmland.

Birds
The IBA supports the second-largest population of the regent honeyeater as well as significant numbers of the near threatened diamond firetail.

References

Important Bird Areas of New South Wales
Northern Tablelands